Davit Sergeenko (born 25 September 1963) is a Georgian physician and healthcare administrator, serving as Georgia's Minister of Health, Labor, and Social Affairs since 25 October 2012. On 13 June 2018 he was named Minister of Internally Displaced Persons from the Occupied Territories, Accommodation and Refugees in the cabinet of Mamuka Bakhtadze.

Early life and medical career 
Sergeenko was born in Tbilisi, the capital of then-Soviet Georgia in 1963. He graduated from the Tbilisi State Medical Institute as a pediatrician in 1987 and the Moscow Institute for Continued Medical Education as an intensive care specialist in 1991. Returning to Georgia, he practiced neonatology in Sukhumi and Rustavi from 1987 to 1992. He then served in the Georgian Armed Forces as a physician for an air force regiment from 1992 to 1993 and as a chief of medical service at the State Department of Sports from 1995 to 1997. He worked as an ICU physician at the Jo Ann Medical Center in Tbilisi from 1997 to 2006 and a medical services manager at the MediClub-Georgia clinic from 2002 to 2006. In 2006, he became Director General of a medical center in the provincial town of Sachkhere, funded by the billionaire tycoon Bidzina Ivanishvili, a Sachkhere native who had amassed his wealth in Russia in the 1990s.

Government career 
After Ivanishvili's Georgian Dream coalition won the October 2012 parliamentary election and subsequently formed the new government, Sergeenko was made Minister of Health, Labor, and Social Affairs in the cabinets of Ivanishvili and of his protégé and successor, Irakli Garibashvili.

Sergeenko presided over the establishment of the government-funded Universal Health Care system in February 2013. As the Georgian government's support to post-revolutionary Ukraine amid a brewing confrontation with Russia was reserved, Sergeenko was the only Georgian minister to have visited Kyiv in August 2014; he then oversaw Georgia's humanitarian aid, worth of about GEL 1 million (US$570,000), to Ukraine in September 2014. Sergeenko was also behind the controversial law adopted in August 2014, tightening the regulation of prescription drugs. He also suggested, in May 2013, that Georgia might consider decriminalization of marijuana as part of the strategy to tackle on illicit drug-trafficking channels.

References

External links

1963 births
Living people
Government ministers of Georgia (country)
Healthcare managers from Georgia (country)
Physicians from Tbilisi
Georgian people of Ukrainian descent
Tbilisi State Medical University alumni
Recipients of St. George's Order of Victory